Leccia is a surname. Notable people with the surname include:

 Ange Leccia (born 1952), French painter, photographer and film-maker
 Francisco Mago Leccia (1931–2004), Venezuelan ichthyologist
 Jessica Leccia (born 1976), American actress

See also
 Ponte Leccia, village in Corsica